GZ Velorum is a single, orange-hued star in the southern constellation of Vela. It is a faint star but visible to the naked eye, having an apparent visual magnitude of 4.58. It is moving further away with a heliocentric radial velocity of +13 km/s.

This is a bright giant star with a stellar classification of K2.5 II. It is a slow irregular variable of type LC with a frequency of 0.16585 cycles per day. In the R (red) band, the magnitude of the star ranges from 3.43 down to 3.81. At the estimated distance of GZ Vel, this yields a physical size of about 140 times the radius of the Sun.

GZ Vel is 30 million years old with 9 times the mass of the Sun. It is radiating 9,241 times the Sun's luminosity from its photosphere at an effective temperature of 4,140 K.

References

K-type bright giants
Slow irregular variables
Vela (constellation)
089682
050555
Velorum, GZ
4063
Durchmusterung objects